Piotr Nierychło (29 April 1921 – 29 February 1976) was a Polish football player and manager.

Football

Nierychło started his playing career with AKS Chorzów. In 1946 he joined Lechia Gdańsk, with whom he played for 6 seasons playing a total of 76 games. Despite only scoring 2 goals for Lechia he scored Lechia's first goal in the Polish top division, scoring against Cracovia from a direct freekick. 

After his playing career Nierychło moved into management, first managing the Lechia Gdańsk second team from 1957 to 1960. During his time with the Lechia II team, he led the team to the junior championship title. In 1960 Nierychło became the manager of the Lechia first team, leaving the role in 1961.

References

1921 births
1976 deaths
Polish footballers
Polish football managers
Lechia Gdańsk players
Lechia Gdańsk managers
Association football midfielders